The 1965 Harelbeke–Antwerp–Harelbeke was the 8th edition of the E3 Harelbeke cycle race and was held on 27 March 1965. The race started and finished in Harelbeke. The race was won by Rik Van Looy of the Solo–Superia team.

General classification

Notes

References

1965 in Belgian sport
1965